The Reichenau Glossary is a collection of Latin glosses likely compiled in the 8th century in northern France to assist local clergy in understanding certain words or expressions found in the Vulgate Bible.

Background 
Over the centuries Jerome’s translation of the Bible (c. 382–405) became more difficult to read for novice clergy as a result of the various grammatical, lexical, and phonological changes that spoken Latin was experiencing. To facilitate interpretation, scribes would put together glossaries or collected explanations of words or phrases found in the Vulgate. The words used as glosses tended to be those that were destined to survive in Romance, while the words that needed glossing generally were not.

What we now know as the Reichenau Glossary was compiled circa the eighth century at the Abbey of Corbie in Picardy. From there it eventually found its way to the Abbey of Reichenau, in southern Germany, where it was ‘discovered’ in 1863 by the philologist Adolf Hotzmann.

Selected entries 

{| class="wikitable"
! Term found in Vulgate 
!Meaning
!Descendants
| rowspan="283" |
! Gloss(es) !! Origin !! Descendants
|-
|
|hidden.
|—
|
|PR. OFr. OOcc. Cat. OSp. OPt. Vnz. It. Ro. 
|-
|abio
|go_away.
|—||uado||Vado meant 'hurry, rush' in CL. ||PR. */ˈβao/OFr. vois Fr. vaisCat. vaigOcc. vauSp. voyAst. voPt. vouVnz. vagoVgl. visIt. vadoNap. vaco
|-
| rowspan="2" |abgetarii
| rowspan="2" |woodworkers
| rowspan="2" |—
| rowspan="2" |carpentarii
| rowspan="2" |CL for 'wagon makers'.
|PR. */karpenˈtarʲi/nomOFr. charpentier
|-
|PR. */karpenˈtarʲos/accFr. charpentiersOcc. carpentièrsSp. carpinterosPt. carpinteiros
|-
|absintio
|wormwood.
|PR. */apˈsɪntʲo/OFr. assenzOOcc. aussenSp. axenxoVgl. ascianzOIt. assenzo
|aloxino
|Greek ἀλόη όξίνης 'bitter aloe'.
|PR. */aˈlɔksɪna/Fr. aluineOSp. alosnaPt. alosna
|-
|adolescentia
|youth
|—
|iuuentus
|CL synonym.
|PR. */jʊˈβɛntu/OFr. joventOcc. joventCat. jovent
|-
|aculeus
|stinger
|—
|aculeonis
|Derivative based on CL aculeus + -o, -onis, originally a noun-forming suffix but serving here merely as an extender. Note the Gallo-Romance analogical nominative in place of the expected *aculeo.
|PR. */akuˈlʲone/Fr. aiguillonOcc. agulhonSp. aguijónGlc. aguillón
|-
| rowspan="2" |aes
| rowspan="2" |bronze
| rowspan="2" |—|| rowspan="2" |eramen|| rowspan="2" |Derivative based on aer- (obl. stem of aes) + -men, originally a noun-forming suffix but serving here merely as an extender. Attested in the fourth-century Codex Theodosianus. ||PR. */aˈramen/Fr. airainOcc. aramCat. aramPt. arameRms. arom It. rameRo. aramăSrd. ràmene
|-
|PR. */aˈramɪne/Sp. alambre
|-
| rowspan="2" |ager
| rowspan="2" |field
| rowspan="2" |PR. */ˈaɡru/Occ. agrePie. aireIt. agroRo. agru'field, land'

| rowspan="2" |campus|| rowspan="2" | Already a near-synonym in CL. || PR. */ˈkampʊs/nomOFr. chans
|-
|PR. */ˈkampu/accFr. champOcc. campCat. campSp. campoPt. campoRms. champVgl. cuompIt. campoNap. campoSrd. campoRo. câmp
|-
|annuant
|nod.
|—
|cinnant
|Verb based on LL cinnus 'wink', a word of obscure origin.
|PR. */ˈkɪnnant/OFr. cenentOOcc. cenanPt. acenam+prefIt. accennano+pref
|-
|anxiaretur
|worry.
|OIt. ansiaSp. ansiaPt. ansia'eagerly await'
|angustiaretur
|LL verb based on CL angustia 'tribulations, difficulties'.
|PR. */anˈɡʊstʲat/Fr. angoisseOcc. angoissaCat. angoixaIt. angoscia
|-
| rowspan="2" |aper
| rowspan="2" |boar
| rowspan="2" |PR. */ˈapru/Srd. porcapru|| rowspan="2" |saluaticus porcus|| rowspan="2" |Periphrase, lit. 'wild pig'.
| PR. */ˈpɔrkʊs salˈβatɪkʊs/nomOFr. pors salvadges
|-
|PR. */ˈpɔrku salˈβatɪku/accFr. porc sauvageOcc. pòrc salvatgeCat. porc salvatgeRms. portg selvadiVgl. puarc salvuticIt. porco salvaticoRo. porc sălbatic
|-
|arbusta
|orchards
|Glc. albustre
|arbricellus
|Rendering of *arboriscellus, a postclassical compound based on CL arbor, arboris 'tree' + -cellus, a conflation of CL -culus and -ellus, both diminutive-forming suffixes.
|PR. */arborɪsˈkɛllu/Fr. arbrisseauOcc. arbrissèl'shrubbery'It. arboscello'sapling'
|-
|area
|threshing-floor
|PR. */ˈarʲa/Fr. aireOcc. ièraCat. eraSp. eraPt. eiraIt. aiaRo. arie
|danea
|Frankish *dannja.
|Wal. dègne
|-
|arena
|sand
|PR. */aˈrena/OFr. areineOcc. arenaCat. arenaSp. arenaPt. areiaIt. renaNap. renaSrd. renaARo. arinã||sabulo|| CL for 'gravel'. ||PR. */saˈblone/Fr. sablonOcc. sablonCat. saulóSp. sablónRms. sablunVgl. salbaunIt. sabbione IRo. salbun
|-
|armilla
|bracelet
|PR. */arˈmɪlla/Sp. armella
|baucus
|Ultimately from Proto-Germanic *baugaz.
|OFr. bou
|-
|atram
|black.
|—||nigram|| Nearly synonymous with atram in CL and replaced the latter in LL. || PR. */ˈnɪɡra/Fr. noireGsc. neraOcc. negraCat. negraSp. negraPt. negraPie. neiraRms. naireVgl. niaraIt. neraNap. neuraRo. neagră
|-
| rowspan="2" |axis
| rowspan="2" |axle
| rowspan="2" |PR. */ˈakse/Fr. ais'plank'Occ. aisCat. eixSp. ejeAst. eisPt. eixoIt. asse'beam, axle'|| rowspan="2" |ascialis|| rowspan="2" |An attempt to render *axialis, a postclassical compound based on CL axis 'axle' + -alis, originally an adjective-forming suffix. ||PR. */akˈsale/OFr. aissel
|-
|PR. */akˈsile/Fr. essieu
|-
|benignitate
|kindness.
|—
|bonitate
|Often had this sense in CL.
|PR. */bonɪˈtate/Fr. bontéOcc. bontatCat. bontatSp. bondadPt. bondadeOIt. bontadeIt. bontàRo. bunătate
|-
|binas
|in_pairs.
|—||duas et duas|| Periphrase, literally 'two and two'. || Fr. deux à deuxSp. de dos en dosPt. de dois em doisIt. due a due
|-
|calamus
|reed-pen
|PR. */ˈkalamu/Fr. chaume'stubble, thatch'
|penna
|CL for 'feather', reflecting a change in the usual writing implement by late antiquity.
|PR. */ˈpɪnna/OFr. penePt. penaIt. pennaSic. pinnaRo. peană
|-
|callidior
|devious.
|—||uitiosior||Comparative form of CL uitiosus 'wicked, corrupt'.||PR. */βɪˈtʲosu/OFr. voisosOcc. viciósCat. viciós'depraved'It. vezzoso'charming'
|-
|calumpniam
|slander.
|PR. */kaˈlʊmnʲa/OFr. chalongeOOcc. calonjaOSp. caloñaOPt. coima
|contentio||CL for 'quarrel, dispute'.|| PR. */tenˈtʲone/-prefOOcc. tensón
|-
|calx
|heel
|PR. */'kalke/OPt. couceGlc. coucePt. coiceOSp. coçeSp. coz'kick'
|calcaneum
|Compound based on calx + -aneus, originally an adjective-forming suffix but now serving merely as an extender.
|PR. */kalˈkanʲu/OFr. calcainGsc. caucanhCat. calcaniOSp. calannoRms. chalchagnIt. calcagnoSrd. carcanzuARo. cãlcãnjuRo. călcâi
|-
|caminum
|furnace.
|PR. */kaˈminu/Rms. chaminVgl. camainIt. camino
|clibanum
|A late borrowing of Greek κλίβανος. Did not survive in Romance.
|—
|-
|cartallo
|basket.
|—||panario|| CL for 'breadbasket'.|| PR. */paˈnarʲu/Fr. panierOcc. panièrSp. paneroPt. paneiroOIt. panaioNap. panaro
|-
| rowspan="2" |caseum
| rowspan="2" |cheese.
|PR. */ˈkasʲu/Sp. quesoPt. queijoVgl. chisTsc. cascioNap. casoSrd. casuRo. caș|| rowspan="2" |formaticum|| rowspan="2" |Compound based on CL forma 'mould' + -aticus, a derivational suffix that became especially popular in Gallo-Romance. The original sense here appears to have been 'that which is made in a mould'. || rowspan="2" | Fr. fromageOcc. formatgeCat. formatge
|-
|PR. */kaˈsʲɔlu/dimRms. chaschöl
|-
|crastro
|barracks.
|PR. */ˈkastru/Sp. castroPt. castro
|heribergo
|Frankish *heriberga.
|OFr. herbergeOcc. albèrgo
|-
|cementarii
|stonecutters
| rowspan="2" |Fr. cimentiers||mationes|| rowspan="2" |Frankish *makjo.
|-
|cementariis
|stonecutters.
|macionibus
|-
|cenacula
|chambers
|—||mansiunculas||LL diminutive of CL mansio 'lodging'.|| PR. */maˈsʲones/-dimFr. maisonsOcc. maisonsSp. mesónesOPt. meijãoesVgl. mošune'barns'It. magioni'houses'Srd. masonesherds'
|-
|cesis
|beaten.
|—
|flagellatis
|CL for 'whipped'.
|PR. */flaɡelˈlatos/OFr. flaelez
|-
| rowspan="2" |cibaria
| rowspan="2" |food
| rowspan="2" |—
| rowspan="2" |cibus uiuendi
| rowspan="2" |A phrase reminiscent of Proto-Romance *uiuanda 'food', an alteration of CL uiuenda 'that which is necessary for life'.
|PR. */βiˈβanda/Fr. viande'meat'Occ. viandaIt. vivanda'food'
|-
|PR. */βiˈβɛnda/Sp. viviendaPt. vivenda'residence, housing'
|-
|clibanus
|oven
|—
|furnus
|The more usual CL word.
|PR. */ˈfʊrnu/accFr. fourOcc. fornCat. fornAra. furnoSp. hornoPt. fornuRms. furnIt. fornoNap. fuornoSrd. furruARo. furnu
|-
|cliuium
|hill.
|—||montania|| Rendering of *montanea, a postclassical compound based on CL mont- (obl. stem of mons 'mountain') + -anea, originally an adjective-forming suffix but now serving merely as an extender.||PR. */monˈtanʲa/Fr. montagneOcc. montanhaCat. muntanyaSp. montañaPt. montanha Rms. muntognaIt. montagnaNap. muntagna
|-
| rowspan="2" |coccinus
| rowspan="2" |scarlet
| rowspan="2" |—|| rowspan="2" |rubeus|| rowspan="2" | CL for 'red'. || PR. */ˈrʊβʲʊs/nomOFr. roges
|-
|PR. */ˈrʊβʲu/accFr. rougeGsc. arruiOcc. rogeCat. roigAra. roioSp. rubioPt. ruivoPie. rubiIt. robbioSrd. rubiuRo. roib
|-
|colliridam
|pastry.
|—
|turtam
|Already attested in the first-century Vindolanda tablets. Presumably from torta 'twisted', in reference to the shape of the pastry.
|PR. */ˈtʊrta/Fr. tourteOcc. tortaSp. tortaRms. turtaVgl. turtaIt. tortaSrd. turtaRo. turtă
|-
|commutatione
|exchange.
|—||concambiis||Late borrowing of Gaulish *cambion. The glosser has added the prefix con- by analogy with commutatione.||PR. */ˈkambʲu/-prefFr. changeOcc. cambiCat. canviSp. cambioPt. cambioIt. cambioRo. schimb
|-
|compellit
|urge.
|—
|anetset
|Frankish *anhattian.
|OFr. anecetOIt. anizzaOPt. anaça
|-
|concidit
|cut.
|—||taliauit|| Verb based on CL talea 'cutting from a plant'. || PR. */taˈlʲaut/Fr. taillaCat. tallàSp. tajóPt. talhouIt. tagliò Ro. tăie
|-
| rowspan="2" |contumeliam
| rowspan="2" |belittlement.
| rowspan="2" |—|| rowspan="2" |uerecundiam|| rowspan="2" | CL for 'shame, disgrace'. || PR. */βerˈɡʊnʲa/Fr. vergogneOcc. vergonhaCat. vergonyaOSp. verguennaAst. vergoñaPt. vergonhaIt. vergognaNap. vregogna
|-
|PR. */βerˈɡʊndʲa/Occ. vergunjaSp. vergüenzaOPt. vergonçaLmb. vargonjaSrd. brigunza
|-
| rowspan="2" |coturnices
| rowspan="2" |quail.
|PR. */kotʊrˈnikes/Sp. codornizesPt. codornizesOIt. cotornici|| rowspan="2" |quacoles|| rowspan="2" | Onomatopoeic.|| rowspan="2" | PR. */ˈkʷakkolas/Fr. caillesOcc. calhasCat. guatlesRib. guallasRms. quacrasIt. quaglie
|-
|PR. */kotʊrˈniklas/dimRo. potârnichi'partridges'
|-
|scabrones
|hornets
|PR. */karaˈbrones/Pt. cambrãosIt. calabroni
|uuapces
|Frankish *wapsa.
|Fr. guêpes
|-
| rowspan="2" |crebro
| rowspan="2" |sieve.
| rowspan="2" |—
| rowspan="2" |criuolo
| rowspan="2" |The same word after liquid dissimilation. The extra  appears to be a hypercorrection.
|PR. */ˈkriβru/Fr. cribleAra. gribafemSp. criboPt. crivoPie. cribiLmb. cribiSrd. chilibruRo. ciur
|-
|PR. */kriˈβɛllu/dimGsc. crièthOcc. crivèlCat. garbellIt. crivello
|-
|crura
|shins
|—||tibia|| Had this sense in CL as well. || PR. */ˈtiβʲa/Fr. tige'stem'
|-
| rowspan="2" |culmen
| rowspan="2" |peak
|PR. */ˈkʊlmen/It. colmoPt. cumeRo. culme
| rowspan="2" |spicus
| rowspan="2" |Attested Classical variant of spica 'point' or 'ear of grain'.
|PR. */sˈpiku/accFr. épiOcc. espicFrl. spiRo. spic
|-
|PR. */ˈkʊlmɪne/Sp. cumbre
|PR. */sˈpika/femOcc. espigaCat. espigaSp. espigaPt. espigaVgl. spaicaIt. spigaSrd. ispica
|-
|cuncti
|all.
|—||omnes|| CL synonym. || PR. */ˈɔmnes/OIt. onni
|-
|da
|give.
|PR. */ˈda/Gsc. daAra. daSp. daPt. dáRms. Vgl. duIt. dàSrd. daRo. dă
|dona|| CL synonym and cognate that became more popular in Gallo-Romance. || PR. */ˈdona/Fr. donneOcc. donaCat. donaAra. dona
|-
|denudare
|lay_bare.
|PR. */dɪsnuˈdare/Fr. dénuer'deprive'Sp. desnudarPt. desnudar'undress'||discooperire|| Compound based on CL dis- (a negating prefix) + cooperire 'cover up'. || PR. */dɪskopeˈrire/Fr. découvrirOcc. descobrirCat. descobrirSp. descubrirPt. descobrirPie. descörveIt. discoprireRo. descoperire
|-
|detestare
|revile.
|—||blasphemare|| A late borrowing of Greek βλασφημέειν 'id.' || PR. */blasteˈmare/Fr. blâmerOcc. blaimarCat. blasmarSp. lastimarPt. lastimarVgl. blasmurOIt. biastemmiareSrd. brastimarRo. blestemare
|-
|dilecta
|love.
|—
|amata
|CL synonym in this context.
|PR. */aˈmata/OFr. amedeFr. aiméeOcc. aimadaCat. amadaAra. amataSp. amadaPt. amadaVnz. amàIt. amataSrd. amada
|-
|ducta
|lead.
|PR. */ˈdʊkta/OFr. duiteOOcc. duchaCat. duitaOSp. duchaOIt. dottaRo. dusă||menata|| Past participle of minare, a regularization of the CL deponent minari 'threaten', with the sense evolution apparently in reference to yelling at livestock to make them move along. || PR. */mɪˈnata/OFr. menedeFr. menéeOcc. menadaCat. menadaAra. menataIt. menataRo. mânată
|-
|emit
|buy.
|—||comparauit|| Meant 'obtain' in CL. || PR. */kompaˈraut/OFr. compratGsc. crompáCat. compràSp. compróPt. comprouIt. compròRo. cumpără'bought'
|-
| rowspan="2" |ensis
| rowspan="2" |sword
| rowspan="2" |—|| rowspan="2" |gladius|| rowspan="2" | More usual CL synonym. || PR. */ˈɡlajʊs~ˈɡladʊs/nomOFr. glais'sword-lily'
|-
|PR. */ˈɡlaju~ˈɡladu/accFr. glai'sword-lily'OOcc. glaziIt. ghiado'sword'
|-
|escas
|food.
|PR. */ˈɛskas/Fr. eschesOcc. escasCat. esquesSp. yescasPt. escas'bait'It. esche'bait, tinder'Ro. iești'tinder'
|cibos
|CL synonym.
|PR. */ˈkɪβos/Sp. cebosPt. cevos'bait'
|-
|exacerbauerunt
|irritate.
|—
|exasperauerunt
|CL synonym. The unprefixed version apparently survived in Proto-Romance as asprire, with a change in conjugation. 
|PR. */asˈprirʊnt/-prefOFr. asprirentOIt. asprirono
|-
|exaurire
|drain.
|—
|scauare
|CL excauare 'hollow out, empty', from ex- + cauare, a verb based on cauus 'hollow, empty'.
|PR. */skaˈβare/OFr. eschaverOcc. escavarSp. escavarPt. escavarRms. stgavarIt. scavare
|-
|exterminabit
|uproot.
|—||eradicabit|| CL synonym. || PR. */eradiˈkare/Fr. arracherGsc. arrigarOOcc. arazigarGlc. arrigarRo. ridicare
|-
|exuerunt
|strip_away.
|—
|expoliauerunt
|CL synonym.
|PR. */spoˈlʲarʊnt/OFr. espoillierentIt. spogliaronoOSp. espojaronGlc. esbollaron
|-
| rowspan="3" |faretra
| rowspan="3" |arrow-case
| rowspan="3" |—
| rowspan="2" |teca sagittarum
| rowspan="2" |Periphrase, lit. 'container for arrows'. Theca was a Classical borrowing of Greek θήκη 'container', while sagitta was the native Latin term for 'arrow'.
|PR. */ˈteka/Fr. taie'pillowcase'It. tega'pod'Ro. teacă'case, sheath'
|-
|PR. */saˈɡɪttas/OFr. saietesOcc. sagetasCat. sagetesSp. saetasPt. setasOIt. saetteSrd. saittasRo. săgeți
|-
|cupra
|Frankish loan, cf. German Köcher.
|OFr. cuivre
|-
|fatigatus
|tired
|—||lassus|| CL synonym. || PR. */ˈlassʊs/Fr. lasOcc. las
|-
| rowspan="3" |femur
| rowspan="3" |thigh
| rowspan="3" |—||coxa|| CL for 'hip'. || PR. */ˈkɔksa/Fr. cuisseOcc. cuèissaCat. cuixaSp. cujaPt. cuxaPie. cheussaRms. cossaVgl. copsaIt. cosciaSrd. cossaRo. coapsă
|-
| rowspan="2" |cingolo|| rowspan="2" | Meant 'belt' in CL. || PR. */ˈkɪnɡla/OFr. cengleFr. sangleOcc. cenglaCat. cenglePt. cilhaVnz. senghiaIt. cinghia
|-
|PR. */ˈklɪnɡa/Nap. chiengaRo. chingă
|-
| rowspan="2" |ferus
| rowspan="2" |savage
|PR. */ˈfɛrʊs/nomOFr. fiers'proud'|| rowspan="2" |durus|| rowspan="2" | CL for 'harsh, severe'. || PR. */ˈdurʊs/nomOFr. dursRms. dirs
|-
|PR. */ˈfɛru/accFr. fier
'proud'Cat. fer

'ugly'It. fiero'proud'Sp. fiero'wild'
|PR. */ˈduru/accFr. durOcc. durCat. durSp. duroPt. duroLmb. durRms. dirVgl. doirIt. duro
|-
|feruet
|boil.
|PR. */ˈfɛrβet/Sp. hiervePt. ferveRo. fierbe'id.'It. ferve'has a fever'||bullit|| CL synonym. || PR. */ˈbʊllɪt/OFr. boltFr. boutOcc. bolheCat. bulleSp. bulle'id.'Pt. bule'fidgets'It. boleNap. voddeSrd. buddit'id.'
|-
|fex
|dregs
|—
|lias
|Gaulish *ligas.
|Fr. lies
|-
|flare
|blow.
|—||suflare|| CL synonym.|| PR. */sʊfˈflare/Fr. soufflerOcc. soflarAra. soflarOSp. sollarPt. soprarRms. suflarIt. soffiareRo. suflare
|-
|flasconem
|flask.
|OFr. flasconFr. flaconOcc. flasconCat. flascóSp. frascoPt. frascoIt. fiasco
|buticulam
|Diminutive of butis~buttis 'cask', a late borrowing of Greek βοῦττις.
|PR. */bʊtˈtɪkla/Fr. bouteilleOcc. botelha
|-
|fletur
|weep.
|—
|planctur
|CL for 'there is mourning'.
|PR. */ˈplanɡere/infFr. plaindreOcc. planherCat. plànyerOSp. llannerOPt. changerVnz. piànzarVgl. plungroIt. piangereNap. chiagneSic. chiànciriSrd. prangereRo. plângere
|-
|forum
|marketplace
|PR. */ˈfɔru/OFr. fuerFr. fur'extent'Sp. fuero'law'Ro. for 'plaza'||mercatum|| CL synonym in this context. || PR. */merˈkatu/OFr. marchietFr. marchéOcc. mercatCat. mercatSp. mercadoPt. mercadoRms. marchàVnz. marcàIt. mercatoSrd. mercadu
|-
|framea
|type of sword
|—
|gladius bisacutus
|Lit. 'double-edged sword'. Bisacutus is a compound based on CL bis 'twice' + acutus 'sharpened'. For descendants of gladius 'sword', see entry for ensis.
|PR. */bɪsaˈkuta/Fr. besaiguë'carpenter's tool with two sides'It. bisacuta'double-edged'
|-
| rowspan="2" |furent
| rowspan="2" |steal.
| rowspan="2" |PR. */ˈfurent/It. furinoRo. fure
| rowspan="2" |involent
| rowspan="2" |CL for 'sweep down, carry off'.
|PR. */ˈɪmβolent/OFr. emblentOOcc. emblenOCat. emblen
|-
|PR. */ɪmˈβolent/It. involino
|-
|furuus
|brown
|—||brunus|| Frankish *brūn.|| Fr. brunOcc. brunCat. bruSp. brunoPt. brunoRms. brunVgl. broinIt. bruno
|-
|fusiles
|melt.
|—||fundutas|| Postclassical past participle of fundere 'melt'.||PR. */fʊnˈdutas/Fr. fonduesOcc. fondudasOIt. fondute'melted'
|-
|galea
|helmet
|—||helmus|| Frankish *helm. || OFr. helmeaccFr. heaumeSp. yelmoPt. elmoIt. elmo
|-
|genuit
|give_birth.
|—||generauit|| CL synonym. || PR. */ɡeneˈraut/OFr. gendratFr. engendra+prefGsc. engendrá+prefCat. engendrà+prefSp. engendró+prefPt. gerou
|-
|gratia
|thanks
|—||merces|| CL for 'goods, wages'. || PR. */merˈkede/OFr. mercitFr. merciOcc. mercé'mercy, thanks'Sp. mercedPt. mercê'mercy'OIt. mercé'thanks'It. mercede'mercy'
|-
| rowspan="2" |abenas
| rowspan="2" |reins.
| rowspan="2" |—
| rowspan="2" |retinacula iumentorum
| rowspan="2" |Periphrase, lit. 'reins for pack animals'. CL retinacula 'reins' is reminiscent of Proto-Romance *retina 'id.', a deverbal of retinere 'hold back'.
|PR. */ˈrɛtɪnas/OFr. rednes~resnesFr. rênesOcc. retnasCat. regnesSp. riendasPt. rédeasIt. redine
|-
|PR. */juˈmɛntu/Fr. jument'mare'OSp. iumientoSp. jumentoPt. jumentoIt. giumentoNap. jummèntafem'pack animal'
|-
| rowspan="2" |arundine
| rowspan="2" |reed.
| rowspan="2" |—
| rowspan="2" |ros
| rowspan="2" |Frankish *rausa.
|OFr. rosOcc. raus
|-
|OFr. roseldimFr. roseau
|-
|ebitatum
|weaken.
|—
|bulcatum
|Past participle of *bullicare, a compound based on CL bullire 'boil' + -icare, a verb-forming suffix.
|PR. */bʊllɪˈkatu/OFr. bolgietFr. bougéOcc. bolegatCat. bellugatAra. esbolligato+pref'stirred, agitated'It. bulicato'boiled'
|-
|iacinctinas
|hyacinth.
|PR. */jaˈkintu/Fr. jacinthefemOcc. jacintCat. jacint
|persas
|Ultimately from Persia, perhaps because garments imported from there had this color.
|Fr. perse'blue-green'
|-
| rowspan="2" |hiems
| rowspan="2" |winter
| rowspan="2" |—|| rowspan="2" |ibernus|| rowspan="2" |Nominalization of CL hibernus 'wintry', an adjective derived from hiems.||PR. */imˈβɛrnʊs/nomOFr. iversOOcc. iverns
|-
|PR. */imˈβɛrnu/accOFr. ivernFr. iverOcc. ivèrnCat. hivernSp. inviernoAst. iviernuPt. invernuRms. inviernVgl. inviarnoIt. invernoSrd. iberruRo. iarnăfem
|-
|horreis
|granaries.
|PR. */ˈorrʲu/Cat. orriAst. orruSrd. orriu
|spicariis|| Compound based on CL spica 'ear of grain' + -arium 'place for keeping'.|| PR. */spiˈkarʲu/OWal. 'room for provisions'Grm. Speicher'granary'
|-
|iacere
|throw.
|—
|iactare
|CL frequentative of iacere.
|PR. */jekˈtare/Fr. jeterOcc. getarCat. gitarAra. chitarSp. echarIt. gettareNap. jettàSrd. ghettare
|-
| rowspan="2" |ictus
| rowspan="2" |strike
| rowspan="2" |PR. */ˈɪktu/accPt. eito'''row'
| rowspan="2" |colpus| rowspan="2" |CL borrowing of Greek κόλαφος.
|PR. */ˈkɔlpʊs/nomOFr. cols|-
|PR. */ˈkɔlpu/accOFr. colpFr. coupOcc. còpCat. copIt. colpo|-
|id|it.
|—
|hoc|CL for 'this'.
|PR. */ˈɔk/OFr. uecOcc. oCat. ho'this'Occ. òcOCat. oc'yes'
|-
| rowspan="4" |iecore| rowspan="4" |liver.
| rowspan="4" |PR. */jeˈkʷarʲa/Pt. iguaria'delicacies'
| rowspan="4" |ficato| rowspan="4" |CL ficatum 'foie gras', lit. 'fig-fattened liver', calqued from Greek συκωτόν.
|PR. */ˈfɪkatu/Fr. foieAst. fegaduIt. fegato|-
|PR. */fiˈkatu/Frl. fiâtRo. ficat|-
|PR. */ˈfikatu/Sp. higadoPt. figatoRms. fioNap. ficatoSrd. ficadu|-
|PR. */ˈfɪtaku/Occ. fetgeCat. fetgePie. fidicLmb. fideg|-
| rowspan="2" |indutus| rowspan="2" |dress.
| rowspan="2" |—
| rowspan="2" |uestitus| rowspan="2" |CL synonym.
|PR. */βesˈtitu/accOFr. vestitOcc. vestitCat. vestitAra. vestitoSp. vestidoPt. vestidoVgl. vestiatIt. vestitoSrd. bestiu|-
|PR. */βesˈtutu/accOFr. vestutFr. vêtuOIt. vestuto|-
| rowspan="2" |institis| rowspan="2" |bandages.
| rowspan="2" |—
|fasciolis|CL synonym.
|PR. */fasˈkʲɔlas/OIt. fasciuoleRo. fâșioare|-
|nasculis|Frankish *nastila.|OFr. naslesWal. nâlesIt. nastrimasc
|-
|insultaret|offend.
|—
|inganaret|Based on CL gannire 'snarl' with a prefix and a change in conjugation.
|PR. */ɪnɡanˈnare/OFr. enjanerOcc. enganarCat. enganyarSp. engañarIt. ingannareRo. îngânare|-
|isset|go.
|PR. */ˈisset/Ara. isseLad. jissaOIt. gisseNap. jesseRo. ise|ambulasset|| CL for 'walk'. || PR. */amˈblasset/OFr. alastFr. alâtSp. amblaseIt. ambiasseRo. umblase|-
|ita|yes
|—||sic|| Already used in the sense of 'yes' in Old Latin. || PR. */ˈsik/Fr. siOcc. si'actually, yes'Cat. síSp. síPt. simRms. schiIt. sì'yes'Ro. și'and'
|-
|iuger|acre
|—
|iornalis|Rendering of *diurnalis, a postclassical compound based on CL diurnus 'daily' + -alis, an adjective-forming suffix. In France this term developed the sense of 'land that can be worked by oxen in a day'.
|PR. */jʊrˈnale/OFr. jornal'journal,measure of land'Fr. journalOcc. jornalIt. giornale'journal'
|-
|iugulate|kill.
|PR. */jʊˈɡlatɪs/Ro. junghiați|occidite|CL synonym
|See necetur.
|-
| rowspan="2" |ius| rowspan="2" |law
| rowspan="2" |PR. */ˈjure/OSp. jurOPt. jurIt. giure|legem|| CL near-synonym.|| PR. */ˈleɡe/OFr. leiFr. loiOcc. leiCat. lleiSp. leyPt. leiPie. legeVgl. ligIt. leggeOSrd. legheRo. lege|-
|potestatem|| CL for 'power, authority'. || PR. */potesˈtate/OFr. podestetOOcc. pozestatOIt. podestadeIt. podestà|-
|labium|tub
|—
|conca|Could designate a sort of vessel in CL, but the main sense was 'shell'. Borrowed from Greek κόγχη.
|PR. */ˈkɔnka/Fr. concheOcc. concaCat. concaSp. cuencaIt. conca'basin, watershed'Srd. conca'head'
|-
|lamento|wail.
|—||ploro|| CL for 'weep'. || PR. */ˈploro/OFr. plourFr. pleureOcc. ploriCat. ploroRib. plloroAra. ploroSp. lloroPt. choroPie. piurOIt. pioro|-
|laterum|bricks.
|—
|teularum|CL for 'roof-tiles'.
|PR. */ˈteɡʊlas/OFr. tiules~teillesFr. tuilesOcc. teulasCat. teulesSp. tejasAst. teyaPt. telhasVgl. tacleIt. tegoleSrd. téulas'tiles'Tsc. tegghieIt. teglie'baking-trays'
|-
|lebes|boiler
|—||chaldaria|| LL compound based on CL calid- (obl. stem of calidus 'hot') + -aria, a noun-forming suffix.|| PR. */kalˈdarʲa/OFr. chaldiereFr. chaudièreGsc. cauderaCat. calderaSp. calderaPt. caldeiraVgl. caldiraIt. caldaiaRo. căldare|-
|leua|left.
|—||sinistra|| CL synonym. || PR. */sɪˈnɛstra/Fr. senestreOcc. senèstraOSp. siniestraOPt. sẽestraRms. saniestraOIt. sinestra|-
|liberos|children.
|—||infantes|| CL for 'babies'. ||PR. */ɪnˈfantes/Fr. enfantsOcc. enfantsCat. infants'id.'OSp. ifantesOPt. ifantes'heirs-apparent'Rms. uffantsid.'It. fanti'infantry'
|-
|litus|shore
|PR. */ˈlitu/It. lido|ripa|| CL synonym. || PR. */ˈripa/Fr. riveOcc. ribaCat. ribaSp. ribaPt. ribaRms. rivaVgl. raipaIt. rivaRo. râpă|-
|ludebant|play.
|—||iocabant|| Regularization of the CL deponent verb iocari 'jest, joke'. || PR. */joˈkaβant/OFr. joeventFr. jouaientOcc. jogavanCat. jugavenAra. chugabanSp. jugabanPt. jogavamRms. giogavanVgl. jocuaIt. giocavanoRo. jucau|-
|luto|mud.
|PR. */ˈlʊtu/It. lotoSp. lodoPt. lodoRo. lutSrd. lutu|fecis|CL for 'dregs, sediment'.
|PR. */ˈfɛkes/It. feciSp. hecesPt. fezes|-
|mala punica|pomegranates
|—||mala granata|| Periphrase, lit. 'seeded apples'. ||PR. */mɪlaɡraˈnata/Occ. milgranaCat. magranaAra. mengranaOSp. milgranaSp. granadaPt. granadaIt. melagrana|-
|malus|mast
|—||mastus|| Frankish *mast.|| Fr. mâtOcc. mast|-
| rowspan="2" |manipulos| rowspan="2" |bundles.
|PR. */maˈnʊkli/nomOFr. manoilOIt. manocchiRo. mănuchi| rowspan="2" |garbas|| rowspan="2" | Frankish *garba.|| rowspan="2" | Fr. gerbesOcc. garbasCat. garbesAra. garbasLig. garbe|-
|PR. */maˈnʊklos/accOFr. manoilzCat. manollsSp. manojosPt. molhos|-
| rowspan="2" |mares| rowspan="2" |male animals
| rowspan="2" |—|| rowspan="2" |masculi|| rowspan="2" | CL diminutive of mas, the singular of mares. ||PR. */ˈmaskʊli/nomOFr. masleVnz. mas-ciFrl. mascliIt. maschiRo. mascuri'male pigs'
|-
|PR. */ˈmaskʊlos/accOFr. maslesFr. mâlesOcc. masclesCat. masclesRib. mascllosAra. masclosSp. machosPt. machosRms. mascelsSrd. mascros|-
|mergulum|diver_bird.
|—
|coruum marinum|Lit. 'sea-crow'.
|PR. */ˈkɔrβu maˈrinu/Fr. cormoranOcc. corb marinCat. corb maríSp. cuervo marinoPt. corvo marinho|-
|milites|soldiers
|—||seruientes|| CL for 'servants'. || PR. */serˈβʲɛntes/Fr. sergeants'sergeants'Occ. sirventsCat. serventsSp. sirvientes'servants'
|-
|minas|threats.
|—
|manaces|Feminine noun based on CL minacia 'menacing'.
|PR. */mɪˈnakʲas/Fr. menacesGsc. miaçasOcc. menaçasOSp. menaçasOPt. mẽaçasIt. minacce|-
|mutuo acceperam|borrow.
|—||impruntatum habeo|| *Impruntare is a rendering of *impromutuare, a postclassical compound based on mutuare (a regularization of the CL deponent verb mutuari 'borrow') with the prefixes in- and pro-. The overall expression impruntatum habeo (lit. 'I have [it] borrowed) reflects the characteristic Romance periphrastic preterite.|| PR. */ˈajo ɪmprumʊˈtatu/OFr. ai empruntetOcc. ai empruntatRo. am imprumutat|-
|mutuum dare|lend.
|—
|prestare|CL for 'provide, furnish'.
|PR. */presˈtare/Fr. prêterOcc. prestarCat. prestarSp. prestarPt. prestarIt. prestare|-
|necetur|kill.
|PR. */neˈkare/OFr. neierFr. noyerOcc. negarSp. anegar+prefIt. annegare+prefARo. necare|occidetur|| CL synonym. In all of Romance the sense of necare specialized to 'kill by drowning', so this gloss serves to clarify the intended meaning 'kill'.|| PR. */okˈkidere~au̯kˈkidere/OFr. ocidreOcc. aucirIt. uccidereRo. ucidereSrd. occhidere|-
|nemini|nobody.
|PR. */ˈnemɪni/Ro. nimeni||nulli|| CL synonym.||PR. */ˈnullu/accFr. nulOcc. nulCat. nulVgl. nulIt. nulloSrd. nudduSic. nuḍḍu'none, futile'
|-
|nent|weave.
|—
|filant|Verb based on CL filum 'thread'.
|PR. */ˈfilant/Fr. filentGsc. hilanOcc. filanCat. filenIt. filanoSp. hilanPt. filam|-
| rowspan="2" |nonnulli| rowspan="2" |several
| rowspan="2" |—|| rowspan="2" |multi|| rowspan="2" | CL synonym. || PR. */ˈmʊlti/nomOFr. moltOOcc. muchIt. moltiRo. mulți|-
|PR. */ˈmʊltos/accOFr. molzCat. molsSp. muchosAst. munchosPt. muitos|-
|non pepercit|not spare.
|—
|non sparniauit|Frankish *sparanjan.|OFr. nen esparnatIt. non sparagnò|-
|nouacula|razor
|PR. */noˈβakla/Cat. navallaSp. navajaAst. navajaPt. navalha||rasorium|| CL rad-, stem of radere 'shave'), + -sorium, a postclassical suffix denoting an instrument.|| PR. */raˈsorʲu/Fr. rasoirOcc. rasorCat. raorSp. raseroIt. rasoio|-
|nouerca|stepmother
|PR. */noˈβɛrka/ARo. ||matrastra|| Compound based on CL matr- (oblique stem of mater 'mother') + -astra 'wannabe' (feminine variant of -aster). || PR. */maˈtrastra/Fr. marâtreOcc. mairastraCat. madrastraSp. madrastraPt. madrastaPie. marastraLmb. madrastra|-
|nosse|know.
|—||scire|| CL near-synonym.|| PR. */sˈkire/Ro. știreSrd. ischire|-
|nutare|wobble.
|—
|cancellare|CL for 'criss-cross'. The Romance sense developed from the notion of crossing one's legs while walking.
|PR. */kankelˈlare/Fr. chanceler|-
|ocreas|greaves.
|—||husas|| Frankish *hosa.|| OFr. huesesOSp. uesas OPt. osasOIt. uose|-
|offendas|drive_away.
|—
|abattas|| Prefixed alteration of CL battuas.|| PR. */abˈbattas/Fr. abattesOcc. abatasCat. abatis Sp. abatas Pt. abatasIt. abbatta|-
| rowspan="2" |onager| rowspan="2" |wild donkey
| rowspan="2" |—|| rowspan="2" |asinus saluaticus|| rowspan="2" |Asinus is CL for 'donkey'. For saluaticus, see entry for aper.|| PR. */ˈasɪnʊs/nomOFr. asnes|-
|PR. */ˈasɪnu/accOFr. asne Fr. âneGsc. asoOcc. asneCat. aseSp. asno Pt. asnoLig. âzePie. asoLmb. asenRms. asenVnz. axenoIt. asinoRo. asenSrd. áinu|-
| rowspan="2" |onustus| rowspan="2" |burden.
| rowspan="2" |—|| rowspan="2" |carcatus|| rowspan="2" | Past participle of *carricare, a verb based on CL carr- (obl. stem of carrus 'wagon') + icare, a verb-forming suffix.||PR. */karrɪˈkatʊs/nomOFr. chargiezOOcc. cargats|-
|PR. */karrɪˈkatu/accOFr. chargietFr. chargéOcc. cargatCat. carregatSp. cargadoPt. carregadoIt. caricatoRo. încărcat+pref
|-
| rowspan="3" |oppidis| rowspan="3" |towns.
| rowspan="3" |—||ciuitatibus|| LL for 'cities', a semantic alteration of CL ciuitas 'citizenry'.|| PR. */kiβˈtates/Fr. citésOcc. ciutatsCat. ciutatsSp. ciudadesPt. cidadesRms. citadsVnz. sitàOIt. cittadiIt. città'cities'Ro. cetăți'fortresses'
|-
| rowspan="2" |castellis|| rowspan="2" | CL for 'fortresses'.|| PR. */kasˈtɛlli/nomOFr. chastelOOcc. castelVnz. castełiOIt. castegliIt. castelliSic. casteḍḍi|-
|PR. */kasˈtɛllos/accOFr. chastelsFr. châteauxGsc. castèthsOcc. castèlsCat. castellsSp. castillosAst. castiellosPt. castelosRms. chastèsSrd. casteddos|-
| rowspan="3" |opilio| rowspan="3" |shepherd
| rowspan="3" |—|| rowspan="3" |berbicarius|| rowspan="3" | Compound based on CL ueruex 'ram' + -arius, a suffix denoting occupation.|| PR. */berbɪˈkarʲʊs/nomOFr. bergiers|-
|PR. */berbɪˈkarʲu/accOFr. bergierFr. bergerLim. bargierRo. berbecar|-
|PR. */berbeˈkarʲu/Srd. berbecarju|-
|oportet|be_fitting.
|—||conuenit|| Had this sense in CL as well. || PR. */komˈβɛnɪt/Fr. convientOcc. convenCat. convéSp. convienePt. convémIt. convieneRo. cuvine|-
|optimos|best.
|—||meliores|| CL for 'better'. In Romance it also came to mean 'best'. || PR. */meˈlʲores/Fr. meilleursOcc. melhorsCat. millorsSp. mejoresAst. meyoresPt. melhoresRms. megliersIt. migliori|-
|optimum|best.
|—||ualde bonum|| Periphrase, lit. 'very good'. Valde survived as the first element of OFr. vaudoux and vaupute.|| PR. */ˈbɔnu/OFr. buen, bonFr. bonOcc. bonCat. boSp. buenoPt. bomRms. bunVgl. bunIt. buonoRo. bun|-
|ore|mouth
|—||bucca|| CL for 'cheek'. || PR. */ˈbʊkka/Fr. boucheOcc. bocaCat. bocaSp. bocaPt. bocaRms. bocaVgl. bucaIt. bocca'mouth'Ro. bucă'cheek'
|-
|ostendit|show.
|—||monstrauit|| CL synonym. || PR. */mosˈtraut/OFr. mostratFr. montraGsc. mostràCat. mostràSp. mostróPt. mostrouIt. mostròRo. mustră|-
| rowspan="2" |oues| rowspan="2" |sheep.
|PR. */ˈɔβes/Ro. oi| rowspan="2" |berbices|| rowspan="2" | CL ueruex 'castrated ram'. ||PR. */berˈbikes/Fr. brebisOOcc. berbitzOIt. berbici|-
|PR. */oˈβɪklas/dimFr. ouaillesOcc. oelhasLim. auvelhasCat. ovellesAra. uellasSp. ovejasPt. ovelhas|PR. */berˈbekes/Srd. berbechesRo. berbeci|-
| rowspan="2" |paliurus| rowspan="2" |Christ's thorn
| rowspan="2" |—
| rowspan="2" |cardonis| rowspan="2" |A compound based on CL cardus 'thistle' + -o, -onis, originally a noun-forming suffix but serving here merely as an extender. Note the Gallo-Romance analogical nominative in place of the expected *cardo|PR. */karˈdone/accFr. chardonOcc. cardonIt. cardoneSic. carduni|-
|PR. */ˈkardo/nomSp. cardoPt. cardoIt. cardoSic. cardo|-
|pallium|cloak
|—
|drappum|Frankish *drāpi.|Fr. drapOcc. drapCat. drapSp. trapoPt. trapoVgl. drapIt. drappoSrd. drappu|-
| rowspan="2" |papilionis| rowspan="2" |tent.
| rowspan="2" |PR. */papɪˈlʲone/OFr. paveilun'butterfly, pavilion'Fr. pavillonOcc. pabalhonCt. pavellóSp. pabellónIt. padiglione'pavilion'Fr. papillonOcc. parpalhonCat. papallonaOIt. parpaglione'butterfly'
| rowspan="2" |trauis| rowspan="2" |Gallo-Romance analogical nominative in place of CL trabs 'beam' or 'structure built around a beam' (obl. stem trab-).
|OFr. tresnom
|-
| PR. */ˈtraβe/accOFr. tref'tent, beam'OOcc. trauPt. traveIt. trave|-
|pabula|blister
|—
|uisica|Could have this meaning in CL as well, but its main sense was 'bladder'.
|PR. */βekˈsika/Fr. vessieOcc. vessigaCat. veixigaSp. vejigaAst. vexigaPt. bexigaIt. vescicaSrd. bussicaRo. bășică'blister, bladder'
|-
|paria|alike.
|PR. */ˈparʲa/Fr. pairePie. pairaIt. paia'pair(s)'
|similia|CL synonym in this context.
|PR. */ˈsɪmɪles/OFr. semblesOOcc. sembles|-
|pera|bag
|—
|sportellam|CL for 'little basket'.
|PR. */sporˈtɛlla/OOcc. esportèlaSp. esportillaOIt. sportellaSrd. isportedda|-
|peribet|bear.
|—
|perportat|The context is Ioannes testimonium perhibet (John 1:15), 'John bears witness'.
|Fr. il porte témoignageIt. porta testimonianza|-
| rowspan="2" |pes| rowspan="2" |foot
| rowspan="2" |—|| rowspan="2" |pedis|| rowspan="2" | Gallo-Romance analogical nominative in place of CL pes (obl. stem ped-).|| OFr. pieznomOOcc. pes|-
|PR. */ˈpɛde/accOFr. pietFr. piedOcc. pèCat. peuAra. pietSp. piéPt. peRms. peVgl. piIt. piedeSrd. pedeORo. piez|-
| rowspan="4" |pignus| rowspan="4" |pledge
|PR. */ˈpɪɡnʊs/OSp. pennosSp. peño| rowspan="4" |uuadius| rowspan="4" |Frankish *waddi.| rowspan="4" |Fr. gageOcc. gatge'will, testament'
|-
|PR. */ˈpɪɡnu/Rms. pegnIt. pegno|-
|PR. */ˈpɪɡnora/Sp. prendaOIt. pegnora|-
|PR. */pɪɡˈnore/Pt. penhor|-
| rowspan="2" |pingues| rowspan="2" |fat.
| rowspan="2" |—|| rowspan="2" |grassi|| rowspan="2" | An alteration of CL crassi.||PR. */ˈɡrassi/nomOFr. grasVgl. gresIt. grassiRo. grași|-
|PR. */ˈɡrassos/accFr. grasCat. grassosSp. grasosPt. grassosRms. grasSrd. grassos|-
| rowspan="3" |plaustra| rowspan="3" |carts
| rowspan="3" |—|| rowspan="3" |carra|| rowspan="3" | Alteration of CL carrus 'wagon' to the neuter gender. ||PR. */ˈkarras/Rm. care|-
|PR. */ˈkarri/OFr. charIt. carri|-
| PR. */ˈkarros/Fr. charsOcc. carrisCat. carrosSp. carrosPt. carros|-
|pulempta|barley
|PR. */poˈlɛnta/Vgl. poliantaIt. polentaSrd. pulenta|farina|CL for 'flour'.
|PR. */faˈrina/Fr. farineGsc. hariaOcc. farinaCat. farinaSp. harinaPt. farinhaPie. farin-aRms. farinaVgl. farainaIt. farinaSrd. farinaRo. făină|-
|pupillam|pupil.
|—
|nigrum in oculo|Periphrase, lit. 'the black (part) in an eye'.
|Fr. le noir de l'œil|-
|ponatur|put.
|PR. */ˈponere/Fr. pondreGsc. pónerOcc. pondreCat. pondreRib. ponre'lay an egg'Sp. ponerOPt. põerPt. pôrIt. porreSrd. ponnereRo. punere'put, place'
|mittatur|CL mittere 'send' came to mean 'put' in LL.
|PR. */ˈmɪttere/Fr. mettreGsc. méterOcc. metreCat. metreRib. metreSp. meterPt. meterIt. mettereSrd. mintere|-
|ponderatus|burdened
|—
|grauiatus|Past participle of *grauiare, postclassical verb based on CL grauis 'heavy, burdened'.
|PR. */ɡraˈβʲatʊs/OFr. gregiez|-
| rowspan="3" |poplite| rowspan="3" |hock.
| rowspan="3" |—
| rowspan="3" |iuncture ianiculorum| rowspan="3" |Periphrase, lit. 'junctions of the knees'.
|PR. */junkˈturas/Fr. jointuresOcc. jonchurasCat. junturesSp. junturasPt. junturasIt. giunture|-
|PR. */ɡeˈnʊkli/nomOFr. genoilVgl. zenacleIt. ginocchiRo. genunchi|-
|PR. */ɡeˈnʊklos/accOFr. genoilzFr. genouxOcc. genolhsCat. genollsAra. chenollosSp. hinojosPt. joelhosRms. schanuglsSrd. brenucos|-
|pruina|frost
|PR. */pruˈina/Fr. bruine'drizzle'OOcc. bruina'frost'Vnz. puìna'ricotta cheese'It. brina'frost'
|gelata|Compound based on CL gel- (obl. stem of gelus 'frost') + -ata, a Romance noun-forming suffix.
|PR. */ɡeˈlata/OFr. geledeFr. geléeOcc. geladaCat. geladaSp. heladaPt. geadaPie. geladaIt. gelataSrd. ghelada|-
|pugione|dagger.
|—||lancea|| CL for 'spear'.|| PR. */ˈlankʲa/Fr. lanceOcc. lançaCat. llançaSp. lanzaPt. lançaIt. lanciaSrd. lantza|-
|pulchra|beautiful.
|—||bella|| CL synonym.|| PR. */ˈbɛlla/Fr. belleOcc. bèlaCat. bellaAra. bellaRms. bellaVgl. bialaIt. bellaSic. beḍḍa|-
| rowspan="2" |pusillum| rowspan="2" |small.
| rowspan="2" |—
| rowspan="2" |paruum| rowspan="2" |CL synonym.
|PR. */ˈparβu/OFr. parf'small'Pt. parvo'small, dumb'
|-
|PR. */ˈparβʊlu/dimOIt. parvoloIt. pargolo'boy'
|-
|pustula|blister
|—
|malis clauis|Clauus had this sense in CL as well, although its main meaning was 'nail'.
|PR. */ˈklaβu/Fr. clou'nail, pustule'OOcc. clauCat. clauRib. cllauAra. clauSp. clavoPt. cravuPie. ciòvOIt. chiavoSrd. cravu'nail'
|-
|regit|rule.
|PR. */ˈrɛɡɪt/It. reggeSrd. reghet|gubernat|CL synonym borrowed from Greek κῠβερνᾰ́ειν.
|PR. */ɡʊˈβɛrnat/OFr. governetFr. gouverneOcc. governaCat. governaSp. gobiernaPt. governaIt. governaSrd. cuberrat|-
|remetieur|remeasure.
|PR. */meˈtire/Sp. medirPt. medirSrd. metire|remensurabit|Verb based on CL mensura 'measure'.
|PR. */mesuˈrare/Fr. mesurerOcc. mesurarCat. mesurarSp. mesurarPt. mesurarRms. mesirar It. misurare Ro. măsurare|-
|repente|suddenly
|—
|subito|CL synonym.
|PR. */ˈsʊβɪto/OFr. sodeOcc. sopteCat. sopte|-
|reppererunt|find.
|—
|inuenerunt|CL synonym.
|OFr. *envindrentOSrd. *imbennerun|-
| rowspan="2" |res| rowspan="2" |thing
|PR. */ˈres/nomGsc. arrésOcc. resCat. res'nothing'Sp. resSrd. rese'head of cattle'|| rowspan="2" |causa|| rowspan="2" | CL for 'subject matter'. || rowspan="2" | PR. */ˈkau̯sa/Fr. choseOcc. causaCat. cosaSp. cosaOPt. cousaPt. coisaRms. chossaVgl. causaIt. cosaOSrd. casa|-
|PR. */ˈrɛne/accOFr. rien'thing'Fr. rienLim. renGsc. arrénOPt. Glc. ren'nothing'
|-
|respectant|look_back.
|PR. */resˈpɛktant/Pt. respeitamIt. rispettano'respect'||reuuardant|| Compound based on Frankish *wardōn 'watch + re-.|| Fr. regardentOcc. gardan-prefCat. guarden-prefSp. guardan-prefPt. guardam-prefLmb. vàrdenRms. vurdan-prefIt. riguardanoNap. guardano-pref
|-
|restant|stay.
|—
|remanent|CL synonym.
|PR. */reˈmanent/OFr. remainentCat. romanenIt. rimanganoOSp. remaneRo. rămân|-
|reus|guilty
|PR. */ˈrɛu/Vgl. riIt. rioRo. rău'bad, evil'||culpabilis|| LL synonym. || PR. */kʊlˈpaβɪle/Fr. coupableOcc. colpableIt. colpevole'guilty'
|-
|reueretur|fear.
|—
|uerecundatur|CL for 'feel shame'.
|PR. */βerˈɡʊndat/OFr. vergondet|-
| rowspan="2" |rostrum| rowspan="2" |beak
| rowspan="2" |PR. */ˈrostru/Sp. rostroPt. rosto'face'Ro. rost'mouth'|| rowspan="2" |beccus|| rowspan="2" | A borrowing of Gaulish *bekkos. || PR. */ˈbɛkkʊs/OFr. bes|-
|PR. */ˈbɛkku/Fr. becOcc. bècCat. becSp. picoPt. bicoIt. becco|-
|rufa|reddish.
|—||sora|| Frankish *saur.|| Fr. saure'smoked'Occ. saura'yellow'Cat. saura'dark yellow'
|-
|ruga|wrinkle
|PR. */ˈruɡa/Fr. rueLim. rua'street'It. ruga'id.'ARo. arugã'sheep-gate'||fruncetura|| Compound based on Frankish *hrunkja 'wrinkle' + -tura, a noun-forming suffix.|| Fr. fronçure|-
|rupem|rock.
|PR. */ˈrupe/It. rupe'cliff'
|petram|CL borrowing of Greek πέτρα.
|PR. */ˈpɛtra/OFr. piedreFr. pierreOcc. pèiraCat. pedraSp. piedraPt. pedraVgl. pitraIt. pietraRo. piatră|-
|saga|cloak
|PR. */ˈsaja/Fr. saieOSp. sayaPt. saia'skirt'
|cortina|LL for 'curtain', from an earlier CL term for a type of cauldron. The sense evolution is unclear.
|PR. */korˈtina/Fr. courtineOcc. cortinaCat. cortinaSp. cortinaOPt. cortinhaIt. cortina|-
| rowspan="2" |sagma| rowspan="2" |packsaddle
| rowspan="2" |—
|soma|The same word after a number of sound changes.
|PR. */ˈsau̯ma/Fr. somme'packsaddle'Occ. sauma'female donkey'Cat. salma'ton'It. soma'load, burden'It. salma'corpse'
|-
|sella|CL synonym
|PR. */ˈsɛlla/Fr. selleOcc. sèlaCat. sellaOSp. siellaSp. sillaPt. selaVgl. sialaIt. sellaSic. seḍḍaSrd. seddaRo. șa'saddle'
|-
|saniore|healthy.
|—
|plus sano|Periphrase, lit. 'more healthy'. Synthetic comparative characteristic of Romance.
|PR. */plus ˈsanu/Fr. plus sainOcc. pus sanOCat. pus sanOPt. chus sãoLig. chu sanPie. pi sanIt. più sanoSrd. prus sanu|-
|sarcina|package
|PR. */ˈsarkɪna/Ro. sarcinăARo. sartsinã||bisatia|| Reinterpretation of CL bisaccia 'double-sacks' as a feminine singular noun. || PR. */bɪˈsakʲa/Fr. besaceGsc. besaçaOcc. biaçoIt. bisaccia|-
|sartago|pan
|PR. */sarˈtaɡɪne/Occ. sartanNap. sartayineSp. sarténGlc. sartañaPt. sertãSrd. sartaghine|patella|| CL synonym || PR. */paˈtɛlla/OFr. padelaFr. poêleOcc. padèlaCat. paellaSp. padillaRms. padellaIt. padellaSic. pareḍḍa|-
|scinifes|gnats
|—||cincellas|| Likely of onomatopoeic origin.
|PR. */tʲinˈtʲalas/OFr. cincelesVnz. sginsałeIt. zanzareRo. țânțarimasc
|-
| rowspan="2" |segetes| rowspan="2" |crops
| rowspan="2" |—|| rowspan="2" |messes|| rowspan="2" | CL synonym. || PR. */ˈmɛsses/Ct. messesIt. messiSp. miesesPt. messes|-
|PR. */mesˈsjones/OFr. meissonsFr. moissonsOcc. meissons|-
|semel|once
|—||una uice|| Romance periphrase, lit. 'one time'. In CL uice meant 'turn, instance'.
|PR. */una ˈβɪke/OFr. une feisFr. une foisOcc. una vetsSp. una vezPt. uma vez|-
|sepulta|interr.
|PR. */seˈpʊlta/Vgl. sepualtaIt. sepoltalit||sepelita|| Rare CL variant.|| PR. */sepeˈlita/OFr. sevelideFr. ensevelie+prefOcc. sebelidaCat. sebollidaIt. seppellita|-
|sindone|cloth
|PR. */sɪnˈdone/It. sindone|linciolo|CL synonym.
|PR. */lɪnˈtʲɔlu/Fr. linceulOcc. lençòlCat. llençolSp. lenzueloPt. lençolRms. lenzielVgl. linẑòlIt. lenzuolo|-
|singulariter|individually
|—||solamente|| Compound based on CL sola ('alone') + mente, a Romance adverb-forming suffix derived from CL mente (abl. of mens 'mind'), often found in ablative absolutes such as sollicita mente 'assiduously', lit. 'with an assiduous mind'.|| PR. */sola ˈmɛnte/OFr. solementFr. seulementOcc. solamentCat. solamentOSp. solamientePt. somenteIt. solamente|-
|si uis|if want.
|—||si uoles|| Regularization of uis, cf. CL conjugations such as uolunt.|| PR. */si ˈβɔles/OFr. se vuelsFr. *si veuxOcc. se vòlsCat. si volsRms. sche vulsVgl. se vuleIt. se vuoiSrd. si boles|-
| rowspan="2" |solutis| rowspan="2" |free.
| rowspan="2" |PR. */soˈlutos/accOFr. soluz'resolved, paid'
| rowspan="2" |disligatis| rowspan="2" |Past participle of disligare, a compound based on CL dis-, a negating prefix, + ligare 'tie'.
|PR. */dɪslɪˈɡatos/OFr. desliezFr. déliésOSp. deslegadosOPt. deslegados|-
|PR. */dɪslɪˈɡati/It. sligatiRo. dezlegați|-
|sortileus|fortune-teller
|—
|sorcerus|Rendering of *sortiarius, a postclassical compound based on CL sors, sortis 'fortune' + -arius, a suffix denoting occupation.
|PR. */sorˈtʲarʲu/accFr. sorcier|-
| rowspan="2" |spatula| rowspan="2" |palm-frond
| rowspan="2" |Pr. */sˈpatʊla/OFr. espalleFr. épauleOc. espatlaCt. espattlaSp. espaldaPt. espaldaVnz. spałaIt. spallaSic. spaḍḍa| rowspan="2" |rama palmarum| rowspan="2" |Periphrase, lit. 'palm-tree branch'. Rama reflects a collective form based on CL ramus 'branch'.
|PR. */ˈrama/OFr. raimeFr. rameOcc. ramaCat. ramaSp. rama'branch'
|-
|PR. */ˈpalmas/OFr. palmesFr. paumesOcc. palmasCat. palmesSp. palmasPt. palmasIt. palmeSrd. parmasRo. palme|-
| rowspan="2" |stercora| rowspan="2" |excrement
|PR. */sˈtɛrku/OSp. estiercoPt. estercoIt. stercoRo. șterc|| rowspan="2" |femus|| rowspan="2" | CL synonym.|| rowspan="2" |PR. */ˈfɛmʊs/OFr. fiensOcc. fensCat. femAra. fiemo|-
|PR. */sˈtɛrkore/Sp. estiércol|-
|submersi|drown.
|PR. */sʊmˈmɛrsi/It. sommersi||necati|| CL for 'murdered'. || See necetur.|-
|subtilissima|very.thin.
|PR. */sʊpˈtile/OFr. sotilOOcc. sotilOCat. sotilIt. sottileSrd. suttileRo. subțire||perpittita|| Compound based on CL per-, an intensifying prefix, + pittita 'small', a postclassical word of obscure origin.||PR. */pɪtˈtita/Fr. petiteCat. petitaOcc. petita|-
|succendunt|ignite.
|—||sprendunt|| Rendering of *exprendunt, a postclassical compound based on CL ex- + prehendere 'seize'.|| PR. */sˈprɛndʊnt/Fr. éprennent|-
|sudario|priest's_gown.
|PR. */sudaˈrʲɔlu/dimVgl. sedarul'handkerchief'
|fanonem|Compound based on Frankish *fano 'cloth' + -o, -onis, originally a noun-forming suffix but now serving merely as an extender.
|Fr. fanon'papal gown'
|-
| rowspan="2" |sulcis| rowspan="2" |ridges.
|PR. */ˈsʊlki/nomIt. solchiNap. surchi| rowspan="2" |rige| rowspan="2" |Gaulish *rica.| rowspan="2" |OFr. reiesFr. raiesOcc. regas|-
|PR. */ˈsʊlkos/accCat. solcsSp. surcosPt. sucosSrd. surcos|-
|sus|pig
|PR. */ˈsue/Srd. sue||porcus|| CL synonym. || See entry for aper. 
|-
|talpas|moles.
|PR. */ˈtalpas/Fr. taupesOcc. talpasCat. talpsmascSp. toposmascGlc. toupasIt. talpeSrd. tarpas|muli|Borrowing of Frankish *mul.
|Fr. mulotdim'field mouse'
|-
|tectum|roof
|PR. */ˈtektu/OFr. teitFr. toitGsc. teitOcc. techSp. techoGlc. teitoPt. tetoPie. tèitLmb. teccRms. tetgVgl. tiatIt. tetto|solarium|CL for 'roof-terrace'.
|PR. */solˈarʲu/Fr. solierGsc. solèr'loft'
|-
|tedet|annoy.
|—||anoget|| Rendering of *inodiat, a postclassical verb based on CL odium 'hate'. Note that the intervocalic  represents /j/. || PR. */ɪˈnɔjat/Fr. ennuieOcc. enojaCat. enutjaSp. enojaPt. enojaIt. uggia-pref
|-
|tedio|monotony.
|—||tepiditas|| Compound based on CL tepid- (obl. stem of tepidus 'lukewarm') + -itas, a suffix denoting quality. || PR. */ˈtɛpɪdu/OFr. tieveFr. tièdeLim. teddeOcc. tèbeCat. tebiSp. tibioPt. tíbioIt. tiepidoSrd. tépiu'lukewarm'
|-
|tereo|thresh.
|—
|tribulo|Verb based on CL tribulum 'threshing-board', ultimately a derivative of tero.
|PR. */ˈtriblo/OFr. trible, triuleCat. trilloSp. trilloPt. trilhoIt. tribbioSrd. triulo|-
| rowspan="2" |teristrum| rowspan="2" |garment
| rowspan="2" |—||cufia|| Frankish *kuffja.|| OFr. cofieFr. coifeGsc. còhoOcc. còfaPt. coifa|-
|uitta|| CL for 'headband'.|| PR. */ˈβɪtta/OFr. veteCat. vetaSp. beta  Pt. fita It. vettaRo. bată|-
|torax|cuirass
|—||brunia|| Frankish *brunnia.|| OFr. bronieFr. broigneOOcc. 
|-
|trabem|beam.
|See entry for mastus.|trastrum|CL for 'crossbeam'. OFr. tref < trabem could mean 'tent' as well, so this gloss serves to clarify the intended meaning.
|PR. */ˈtrastu/OFr. traste'crossbeam'Sp. trastoPt. traste'junk'
|-
|transferent|carry_across.
|—
|transportent|CL synonym.
|PR. */trasˈpɔrtant/OFr. tresportentOIt. traportano|-
|transgredere|pass_by.
|—||ultra alare||Ultra is CL for 'beyond'. Alare is  a Latinized spelling of OFr. aler 'go'. || OFr. oltre aler|-
| rowspan="2" |transmeare| rowspan="2" |swim_across.
| rowspan="2" |—
| rowspan="2" |transnotare| rowspan="2" |Notare is an alteration of CL natare 'swim' via vowel dissimilation.
|PR. */trasnoˈtare/  OFr. *tresnoder  OIt. tranotare|-
|PR. */noˈtare/-prefOFr. noderRms. nodar  Vgl. notur OIt. notare Rm înotare+pref
|-
|tugurium|hut
|—||cauana|| Of obscure origin. || PR. */kaˈpanna/ OFr. chavane Occ. cabanaCat. cabanyaAra. capannaSp. cabaña Pt. cabanaIt. capanna 
|-
|turibulum|incense burner
|—
|incensarium|LL incens- (obl. stem of incensum 'incense') + -arium 'place for keeping'.
|PR. */ɪnkenˈsarʲu/OFr. encensier 'incense burner'Fr. encensier'rosemary'
|-
|thurmas|crowds.
|PR. */ˈtʊrmas/ It. tormeFrl. torme Ro. turmeSrd. trumas|fulcos|A borrowing of Frankish *folc 'people'.
|OFr. folsFr. foulesfemOOcc. Gsc. hurasfemOcc. fulasfemGlc. foulasfem
|-
|tutamenta|defenses
|—
|defendementa|Compound based on CL defendere 'protect' + -mentum, a noun-forming suffix.
|OFr. defendemenz|-
|uecors|senseless
|—
|esdarnatus|Past participle of *esdarnare, a verb based on es- (later form of CL ex-)+ Frankish *darn 'bewildered'.
|Fr. dial. darne'stumbling, impulsive'
|-
| rowspan="2" |ueru| rowspan="2" |roasting-spit
| rowspan="2" |PR. */βerˈrʊklu/dimOFr. veroilFr. verrouPrv. ferrolhOcc. varrolhCat. forrolhSp. cerrojoPt. ferrolhoIt. verrocchio| rowspan="2" |spidus| rowspan="2" |Frankish *spit.|OFr. espeiznom
|-
| OFr. espeitaccFr. époiSp. espetoPt. espeto|-
|uespertiliones|bats
|PR. */βesperˈtɛllu/dimAst. esperteyuOIt. vipistrello It. pipistrello|calues sorices|An expression based on CL caluas 'bald' + sorices 'shrewmice'.
|PR. */ˈkalβas soˈrikes/Fr. chauves-souris|-
|uestis|garment
|PR. */βestɪˈmɛntu/ Fr. vêtement Rms. büschmaint Vgl. vestemiant Ro. veșmânt|rauba|Frankish *rauba 'spoils of war, garments'
|Fr. robeOcc. raubaCat. robaSp. ropaPt. roupaIt. roba|-
|uim|power.
|—
|fortiam|Reinterpretation of CL fortia 'strong' as a feminine noun.
|PR. */ˈfɔrtʲa/Fr. forceOcc. forçaCat. forçaSp. fuerzaPt. forçaRms. forzaIt. forza|-
| rowspan="2" |uiscera| rowspan="2" |guts
| rowspan="2" |—
| rowspan="2" |intralia| rowspan="2" |Analogous to CL interanea, both ultimately compounds based on Archaic Latin *inter- 'inside' + -anea or -alia, both adjective-forming suffixes.
|PR. */ɪnˈtralʲas/Fr. entraillesOcc. entralhas|-
|PR. */ɪnˈtranʲas/ OFr. entragnes Cat. entranyes Sp. entrañas Pt. entranhas|-
|ungues|fingernails
|—||ungulas|| CL diminutive of ungues.||PR. */ˈʊnɡlas/Fr. onglesOcc. onglasCat. unglesSp. uñasPt. unhasRms. unglasVgl. jongleIt. unghieRo. unghiiSrd. ungras|-
|uorax|devouring
|—
|manducans|CL for 'chewing'. Manducare went on to become the standard word for 'eat' in many Romance languages.
|PR. */mandʊˈkando/ger Fr. mangeantOcc. manjantCat. menjantRms. mangiondOIt. manicandoRo. mâncândSrd. mandicande|-
|urguet|urge_forward.
|—
|adastat|Frankish *haist 'haste'.
|OOcc. adasta|-
| rowspan="2" |usuris| rowspan="2" |loan_interest.
| rowspan="2" |—
| rowspan="2" |lucris|| rowspan="2" | CL for 'profits, wealth'. || PR. */ˈlʊkri/nom ARo. lucri 'objects'
|-
|PR. */ˈlʊkros/acc  OFr. loirs'revenues, assets'Sp. logros Pt. logros  'achievements'
|-
|utere|use.
|—||usitare|| CL freq. of utere.|| PR. */ˈusa/ Fr. use Occ. usaCat. usa Sp. usa Pt. usaIt. usa|-
|utres|wineskins
|PR. */ˈʊtres/Sp. odresPt. odresIt. otriARo. utri|folli|CL folles 'leather bags, bellows'.
|PR. */ˈfɔlles/OFr. folsFr. fousOcc. fòlsCat. folls'madmen, fools'Sp. fuellesPt. folesOIt. folliRo. foaleSrd. foddes'bellows'
|-
| rowspan="2" |uuas| rowspan="2" |grapes.
| rowspan="2" |PR. */ˈuβas/Sp. uvas Pt. uvas Rms. ieuvas It. uveVgl. joiveARo. aue|| rowspan="2" |racemos|| rowspan="2" | CL for 'clusters, bunches' often in reference to grapes. || PR. */raˈkimos/Fr. raisinsOcc. rasim Cat. raïms 'grapes' Sp. racimosPt. racimos'clusters' 
|-
|PR. */raˈkimʊli/dimIt. racimoli'clusters'
|}

 See also 

 Appendix Probi
 Proto-Romance language
 Lexical changes from Classical Latin to Proto-Romance
 Phonological changes from Classical Latin to Proto-Romance

Notes

References

Sources
 General
Adams James Noel. 2007. The regional diversification of Latin. Cambridge University Press.
Alkire, Ti & Rosen, Carol. 2010. Romance languages: A historical introduction. New York: Cambridge University Press.
Anderson, James Maxwell & Rochet, Bernard. 1979. Historical Romance Morphology. Ann Arbor: University Microfilms International.
Diez, Friedrich Christian. 1870. Anciens glossaires romans corrigés et expliqués. Translated by Alfred Bauer. Paris.
Elcock, William Dennis. 1960. The Romance languages. London: Faber and Faber.
Engels, J. 1968. Les ''Gloses de Reichenau'' réédités. Neophilologus 52. 378–386.
Hall, Robert Anderson. 1981. Proto-Romance morphology. Philadelphia: John Benjamins.
Jensen, Frede. 1972. From Vulgar Latin to Old Provençal. University of North Carolina Press.
Jensen, Frede. 1986. The syntax of medieval Occitan. Tübingen: Niemeyer.
Jensen, Frede. 1990. Old French and comparative Gallo-Romance syntax. Tübingen: Niemeyer.
Lausberg, Heinrich. 1970. Lingüística románica, I: Fonética. Madrid: Gredos.
Levy, ELmb. 1923. Petit dictionnaire provençal-français. Heidelberg: Winter.
Lloyd, Paul M. 1987. From Latin to Spanish. Philadelphia: American Philosophical Society.
 Loporcaro, Michele. 2018. Gender from Latin to Romance. Oxford University Press.
Malkiel, Yakov. 1944. The etymology of Portuguese iguaria. Language 20. 108–130.
Malkiel, Yakov. 1983. From particular to general linguistics: Selected essays 1965–1978. Amsterdam: John Benjamins Pub. Co.
Meyer-Lübke, Wilhelm. 1911. Romanisches etymologisches Wörterbuch. Heidelberg: C. Winter.
Marchot, Paul. 1901. Petite phonétique du français prélittéraire: VIe–Xe siècles. Fribourg: B. Veith.
Pei, Mario. 1941. The Italian language. New York: Columbia University Press.
Pope, Mildred K. 1934. From Latin to French, with especial consideration of Anglo-Norman. Manchester University Press.
Posner, Rebecca. 1996. The Romance languages. Cambridge, New York: Cambridge University Press.
Quirós, Manuel. 1986. Las glosas de Reichenau. Filología y Lingüística 12. 43–50.
Rossi, Mario. 2004. Dictionnaire étymologique et ethnologique des parlers brionnais. Paris: Publibook.
Williams, Edwin Bucher. 1962. From Latin to Portuguese. Philadelphia: University of Pennsylvania Press.

 Online etymological dictionariesDexonline (https://dexonline.ro/)Online Etymology Dictionary (http://etymonline.com/)Trésor de la langue Française informatisé (http://www.atilf.fr/tlfi)Treccani'' (https://www.treccani.it/vocabolario/)

External links 

 Scans of the manuscripts from the Baden State Library.

History of the French language
Romance languages
Latin language
Culture of Picardy
8th century in education
Corbie Abbey
1863 in science
1863 in Germany
Culture of Baden-Württemberg
8th-century texts